Bo (Po, Sorimi) is a possible Left May language of New Guinea, in Sandaun and East Sepik Provinces. It is essentially undocumented, and its status as a separate language is unconfirmed. It is spoken in Bo, Kaumifi, Kobaru, and Nigyama Umarita villages in Sandaun Province.

References

Left May languages
Languages of Sandaun Province
Unclassified languages of New Guinea